'Khalaf
' is both a given name and a surname.

Notable people

Given name
Khalaf al-Bazzar (d. 844), canonical reader of the Qur'an
Khalaf I (937–1009), Amir of Sistan
Khalaf Al-Enezi (born 1952), Kuwaiti politician
Khalaf Al Salamah (born 1979), Kuwaiti footballer
Khalaf al-Ulayyan, Iraqi politician
Khalaf Khalafov (born 1959), Azerbaijani politician
Khalaf Masa'deh (died 2015), Jordanian lawyer and politician

Surname
Abbas Khalaf, Iraqi translator
Abdulhadi Khalaf (born 1945), Bahrani political activist and academic
Abdulhadi Khalaf (footballer) (born 1986), Syrian footballer
Ahmad Ibrahim Khalaf (born 1992), Iraqi footballer
Farida Khalaf, ISIS escapee and author
Hevrin Khalaf (1984–2019), Kurdish-Syrian politician and civil engineer
Karim Khalaf (1935–1985), Palestinian politician
Khaled Khalaf (born 1983), Kuwaiti footballer
Riyadh Khalaf (born 1991), Irish media personality / presenter
Rima Khalaf (born 1953), Jordanian UN official
Roula Khalaf, editor of the Financial Times
Salah Khalaf (1933–1991), Palestinian PLO official
Samir Khalaf (born 1933), Lebanese sociologist
Umayyah ibn Khalaf, contemporary of Muhammad